The flag of Acadia is a symbolic flag representing the Acadian community of Canada.  It was adopted on 15 August 1884, at the Second Acadian National Convention held in Miscouche, Prince Edward Island, by nearly 5,000 Acadian delegates from across the Maritimes. It was designed by Father Marcel-Francois Richard, a priest from Saint-Louis-de-Kent, New Brunswick. The Musée Acadien at the Université de Moncton has the original flag presented by Father William to the 1884 Convention. It was sewn by Marie Babineau.

Design

Father Richard selected the French flag as the basis of the Acadian one to underline the adherence of the Acadians to the French civilization:

I wish that Acadia had a flag reminding not only that its children are French, but also that they are Acadians.

Father Richard saw the star in the blue band as "the distinctive emblem of our Acadian nationality", representing the star of the Blessed Virgin of the Assumption, patron of the Acadians. The star also represented the starfish that guides the sailor "through storms and reefs". The gold colour of the star was chosen by Father Richard because it is the colour of the Pope, in order to show both the adherence of the Acadians to the Roman Catholic Church and the role of the Church in the history of Acadia. 

The flag's creation was an important part of the Acadian Renaissance, and its final design reflects the political and religious considerations of that period.

See also
Flag of France
Flag of Acadiana

Sources

Acadia
Acadia
Acadia
Acadian culture